Christopher Paul Hasson (born ) is a former United States Coast Guard lieutenant and self-described white nationalist who pleaded guilty to federal gun and drug crimes in 2019, and the following year was sentenced to more than 13 years in prison. Although not charged with a terrorism offense, prosecutors called Hasson a "domestic terrorist" and accused him of plotting the targeted assassinations of high-profile American politicians, media figures, and others, as well as indiscriminate terror attacks against what Hasson called "leftists in general."

Career
Hasson was an F/A-18 aircraft mechanic in the Marine Corps from 1988 to 1993, achieving the rank of corporal. He was then on active duty with the Army National Guard for approximately two years. He served with the Virginia Army National Guard as an infantryman with Alpha Company, 1st Battalion, 183rd Infantry Regiment. In September 1995, Hasson transferred to the Arizona Army National Guard and left in March 1996, exiting with the same rank as when he joined. He served in the Coast Guard for more than twenty years, initially as an Electronics Technician. At the time of his arrest, Hasson was an acquisitions officer for the Coast Guard's National Security Cutter program at Coast Guard Headquarters, having served in that post since June 2016.

2019 plot

Beliefs, ideology, and 2019 plot
Hasson identifies as a white nationalist. In court filings, prosecutors wrote that Hasson drew inspiration from Norwegian terrorist Anders Behring Breivik and abortion clinic bomber Eric Robert Rudolph. Hasson had been amassing guns and ammunition since 2017. His goals included the assassination of high-profile Democratic and left-leaning politicians and media figures.

Hasson attempted to discover where Democratic politicians and media figures lived and made Google searches such as "what if trump illegally impeached", "civil war if trump impeached", "best place in dc", "where in dc to congress live", "social democrats usa", "most liberal senators", "where do most senators live in dc", "where in dc to see congress people", "do senators have ss  protection", and "are supreme court justices protected". Hasson searched and found out the address of MSNBC host Joe Scarborough. Hasson had expressed belief in the white genocide conspiracy theory.

Hasson created a "hit list" spreadsheet naming various journalists, Democratic politicians, and socialist figures and organizations and used computers at his workplace to study the manifestos of various mass shooters; prosecutors also alleged he used work computers to plan an attack.

In addition to being a self-proclaimed white nationalist, Hasson is a neo-Nazi and he has been a white power skinhead for the last 30 years. He advocated turning the Pacific Northwest into an all-white homeland when he sent a letter to the American neo-Nazi and leader of the Northwest Front Harold Covington stating that he has been on his website briefly and read most of his books. Hasson expressed dissatisfaction with holding public rallies and gaining support from the public in a letter which he wrote several weeks after the Unite the Right rally in Charlottesville, Virginia and preferred militant action, including actions targeting individual public figures who he believed were "Cultural Marxists". Hasson was planning to use biological weapons such as the Spanish flu, botulism, and anthrax to "kill almost every last person on the earth", followed by attacks on the food supply. He recommended building stockpiles in five locations, the contents of which were to be food, firearms, clothing/military gear, and extra mortar recoilless rifles. He recommended gaining combat/military experience and chemistry skills in addition to buying three homes and hideouts. Hasson wanted to use tactics from the Euromaidan protests and the Donbass conflict in Ukraine in order to raise tensions between the "govt/police" and "BLM protestors and other leftist crap". Hasson is an antisemite as expressed in the letter "I don't know if there truly is a 'Conspiracy' of (((People))) out to destroy me and mine, but there is an attack nonetheless". The same letter referred to "muslim scum". Hasson also made searches which included "white homeland", "when are whites going to wake up" and "please god let there be a race war" including the addresses of various Supreme Court justices and a gun to kill African-Americans.

Investigation and arrest
Hasson was arrested on February 15, 2019, in the parking garage of the Coast Guard Headquarters in Washington. Federal investigators executed search warrants at Hasson's apartment and office in Silver Spring, Maryland.

Hasson "conducted online searches and made thousands of visits to websites that contain pro-Russian, neo-fascist, and neo-Nazi literature" between January 2017 and January 2019. Seven rifles, two shotguns, four pistols, two revolvers, and two silencers, along with magazines and ammunition and the opioid tramadol, were found in his home.

Guilty plea and sentencing
Federal prosecutors wrote that Hasson intended "to murder innocent civilians on a scale rarely seen in this country" and described him as "a domestic terrorist, bent on committing acts dangerous to human life."

On February 27, 2019, Hasson was indicted by a federal grand jury on charges of unlawful possession of silencers; possession of firearms by a drug addict and unlawful use; and possession of a controlled substance (specifically, tramadol).

US Magistrate Judge Charles B. Day initially ordered Hasson to be granted pretrial release, on strict bail conditions, including home confinement at his wife's parents' home with GPS monitoring. However, prosecutors appealed this decision and it was immediately reversed by US District Court Judge George J. Hazel, who ordered that Hasson continue to be detained pending trial, citing the potential dangers to the community. Hazel stated that the government's evidence showed that Hasson has specifically planned an attack based on the 2011 massacre in Norway perpetrated by Anders Behring Breivik, and had acquired weapons and ammunition with the purpose of furthering the planned attack.

Hasson initially pleaded not guilty, but in October 2019 entered a guilty plea to three charges: possession of tramadol without a prescription and illegal possession of firearms and the firearm silencers. (Under US federal law, a person who is a "unlawful user and addict of a controlled substance" is prohibited from owning firearms). Hasson admitted that, from 2016 to 2019, he ordered at least 4,650 tramadol pills over the Internet, and admitted that he knowingly possessed firearm silencers that "were not registered in the National Firearms Registration and Transfer Record, and that they did not have serial numbers, as required by law."

In court filings in sentencing, prosecutors wrote that "If not for the diligent efforts of multiple federal law enforcement agencies, we now would be counting the bodies of the defendant's victims instead of years of the defendant's prison time." In contrast, Hasson's defense attorneys argued that Hasson was not a danger to society, and his crimes and fixation "on the notion of ethnic cleansing in the United States and that the country should be turned into a white homeland" arose from his longstanding opioid use disorder, which Hasson developed after becoming addicted to painkillers in the 2010s. On January 31, 2020, Judge Hazel sentenced Hasson to 160 months (a little over 13 years) in prison, followed by four years' supervised release. Hasson's defense attorneys filed a notice of appeal on February 11, 2020, asking the United States Court of Appeals for the Fourth Circuit to review his case. In February 2022, a three-judge panel of the 4th US Circuit Court of Appeals rejected Hasson's appeal. He is serving his sentence at the FCI Butner Medium with BOP# 64544-037.

Reactions
President Donald Trump reacted to the attempted attack by Hasson stating "I think it's a shame" and that it was "a very sad thing".

Joe Scarborough, one of the people targeted in Hasson's list, accused Trump of inspiring Hasson and stated: "This is pretty simple. It's all on the president's shoulders. It's all the president's fault."

Former Republican National Committee chairman Michael Steele accused Trump of silence on Hasson, stating "I guess I kind of at this point have reached the 'my glass is no longer half-full,' it's just overflowing with all the crazy that comes out of Trump. Why would we be surprised that a self-proclaimed nationalist would not speak out against a self-proclaimed white nationalist? Why are we acting like this is a space that Donald Trump is gonna go in on behalf of the American ideal? No, he's not. ... These are his people, alright? And he's not gonna thank law enforcement because he's probably not happy about what law enforcement did."

Vegas Tenold, author of the book Everything You Love Will Burn: Inside the Rebirth of White Nationalism wrote an op-ed on The Guardian titled "The neo-Nazi plot against America is much bigger than we realize" about Hasson and other far-right domestic terrorists.

Hasson's rights to Coast Guard benefits and retirement pay were terminated following his conviction, and Coast Guard Commandant Karl L. Schultz said, "Any semblance of hate, bigotry or advocacy of violence has no place in our Coast Guard. This includes involvement with white supremacist or extremist groups of any type."

Personal life
Hasson is married. He lived in Silver Spring, Maryland.

See also
 Knoxville Unitarian Universalist church shooting (2008), a shooting that targeted liberals (specifically Democrats)
 List of unsuccessful terrorist plots in the United States post-9/11
 October 2018 United States mail bombing attempts, a similar incident involving the targeting of Democrats
 Right-wing terrorism

Notes

References

Year of birth missing (living people)
Living people
21st-century American criminals
Alt-right activists
American conspiracy theorists
American neo-Nazis
American people convicted of drug offenses
Antisemitism in Maryland
History of racism in Maryland
People from Langley Park, Maryland
People from Silver Spring, Maryland
United States Army soldiers
United States Coast Guard officers
United States Marines
Arizona National Guard personnel
Virginia National Guard personnel
1960s births